Ishmael Del'Monte is an Australian bridge player. He is the Vice Chair of the WBF High Level Players Commission.

Bridge accomplishments

Wins

 North American Bridge Championships (5)
 Lebhar IMP Pairs (1) 2007 
 Nail Life Master Open Pairs (2) 2011, 2013 
 Vanderbilt (1) 2012 
 Soloway Knockout Teams (1) 2022

Runners-up

 North American Bridge Championships (3)
 Norman Kay Platinum Pairs (1) 2012 
 Vanderbilt (1) 2011 
 Fast Open Pairs (1) 2012

Notes

External links
 

Australian contract bridge players